The 2022 Miami Grand Prix (officially known as the Formula 1 Crypto.com Miami Grand Prix 2022) was a Formula One motor race that was held on May 8, 2022, at the Miami International Autodrome in Miami Gardens, Florida, United States. It was the first edition of the Miami Grand Prix and the fifth round of the 2022 Formula One World Championship.

The race was won by Max Verstappen, ahead of championship leader and pole-sitter Charles Leclerc in second and his teammate Carlos Sainz Jr. in third. Verstappen also set the fastest lap.

Background

Championship standings before the race 
Charles Leclerc was the Drivers' Championship leader after the fourth round, the Emilia Romagna Grand Prix, with 86 points, 27 ahead of Max Verstappen in second, with Sergio Pérez in third, five points behind Verstappen. In the Constructors' Championship, Ferrari led Red Bull Racing by 11 points and Mercedes by 47.

Entrants 

The drivers and teams were the same as the season entry list with no additional stand-in drivers for the race.

Tyre choices 

Tyre supplier Pirelli brought the C2, C3, and C4 tyre compounds (designated hard, medium, and soft, respectively) for teams to use at the event.

Practice 
There were three practice sessions, each lasted one hour. The first two practice sessions took place on Friday May 6 at 14:30 and 17:30 local time (UTC−04:00) and the third practice session took place at 13:00 on May 7. In the first session, Leclerc was the fastest ahead of George Russell and Verstappen, who had hydraulic and overheating issues. In the second session, Russell set the fastest lap ahead of Leclerc and Pèrez. In the final session, Pèrez was first, ahead of Leclerc and Verstappen. There was a crash and red flag in each session; in the first session, Valtteri Bottas crashed at turn 7, while Carlos Sainz Jr. and Esteban Ocon both crashed into the concrete barrier at turn 14 in the final two sessions, respectively.

Qualifying 
Qualifying took place on May 7 at 16:00 local time and lasted for one hour.

Qualifying report 
Leclerc led Sainz for a Ferrari front-row lockout, the first since the 2019 Mexican Grand Prix. Behind them were the Red Bull drivers, Verstappen and Pérez, and Alfa Romeo's Bottas, with Lewis Hamilton, Pierre Gasly, Lando Norris, Yuki Tsunoda, and Lance Stroll completing the top ten; Russell, Hamilton's Mercedes teammate, did not make the Q3. In his final Q3 lap, Verstappen made a mistake, which he blamed on his lack of knowledge of the car on the track, while both Leclerc and Sainz improved their fastest lap to take the front row.

Qualifying classification 

Notes
  – Esteban Ocon did not take part in qualifying due to an accident during the third practice session. He was permitted to race at the stewards' discretion.

Race 
The race started at 15:30 EDT (UTC−4) on May 8 and lasted 57 laps. Stroll and Vettel, who respectively qualified 10th and 13th, started the race from the pit lane after a fuel temperature issue.

Race report 
In the first corner at the start, Verstappen overtook Sainz for second place and closed in on Leclerc, whom he passed for the lead on lap 9, as Leclerc struggled with the medium compound tyres. The race was interrupted on lap 41, as Norris's rear right tyre made contact with Gasly's front left, triggering a virtual safety car and then a safety car for five laps. Verstappen was pressured from Leclerc at the restart, and defended his position to take the win. On lap 52, Verstappen's teammate, Pérez, attempted to overtake Sainz into turn 1 but made a mistake and locked up. Vettel and Schumacher collided on lap 53, but no action was taken. Leclerc and Sainz finished second and third, respectively, while Pérez, who had temporarily suffered engine issues that cost him about 30 horsepower, and Russell made up the top five.

After the race, Alonso was given two separate five-second penalties, which dropped him out of the top 10 for points, with Stroll promoted to 10th. Magnussen had two separate incidents following the restart with Stroll, retiring on the last lap; he was classified 16th as he completed more than 90% of the race distance.

Race classification 

Notes
  – Includes one point for fastest lap.
  – Lance Stroll and Sebastian Vettel qualified 10th and 13th, respectively, but they started the race from the pit lane as the fuel in their car was below the mandated minimum temperature. Their places on the grid were left vacant.
  – Fernando Alonso finished 8th, but he received two five-second time penalties. The first for causing a collision with Pierre Gasly and the second for leaving the track and gaining an advantage.
  – Daniel Ricciardo finished 11th, but he received a five-second time penalty for leaving the track and gaining an advantage.
  – Kevin Magnussen and Sebastian Vettel were classified as they completed more than 90% of the race distance.
  – Kevin Magnussen received a five-second time penalty for causing a collision with Lance Stroll. His final position was not affected by the penalty.

Championship standings after the race

Drivers' Championship standings

Constructors' Championship standings

 Note: Only the top five positions are included for both sets of standings.

See also 
 2022 W Series Miami round

Notes

References

Further reading 
 
 

Miami
Miami Grand Prix
Miami Grand Prix
Miami Grand Prix
Miami Grand Prix